King of Memphis is the debut studio album by American rapper Young Dolph. It was released on February 19, 2016, by Paper Route Empire. The album's production was handled by Mike Will Made It, TM88, Zaytoven, Nard & B, and Drumma Boy, among others. It was supported by one single – "Get Paid".

Background
On February 9, 2016, Young Dolph took to Twitter to announce the album's title along with the cover art and release date. Young Dolph explained the concept behind King of Memphis during an interview with XXL, saying:

Singles
The lead single for the album, "Get Paid" was released on February 2, 2016.

Reception
{{Album ratings
| MC = 70/100
| rev1 = AllMusic
| rev1score = <ref name=AllMusic>{{AllMusic |class=album |id=king-of-memphis-mw0002921098 |label=King of Memphis |accessdate=7 December 2017}}</ref>
| rev2 = HipHopDX 
| rev2Score = 3.3/5
| rev3 = Spin| rev3score = 7/10
}}King of Memphis'' received positive reviews from critics. On Metacritic, the album holds a score of 70/100 based on 4 reviews, indicating "generally favorable reviews".

Track listing

References

2016 debut albums
Young Dolph albums
Empire Distribution albums
Albums produced by Mike Will Made It
Albums produced by Zaytoven
Albums produced by Nard & B
Albums produced by Drumma Boy
Albums produced by TM88